Fisherman's Island State Park is a public recreation area of  sitting on  of Lake Michigan shoreline southwest of Charlevoix, Michigan. For most of the period from 1998 to 2016, historically low lake levels resulted in the island becoming attached to the mainland via a tombolo. The park's interior terrain consists largely of rolling dunes covered with maple, birch and aspen broken up by bogs of cedar and black spruce. The park is operated by the Michigan Department of Natural Resources.

Activities and amenities
The park features rustic campgrounds with some sites nestled in the dunes along the lake shore. The park offers picnicking, swimming beaches, over three miles of hiking trails, hunting, and snowmobiling.

References

External links
Fisherman's Island State Park Michigan Department of Natural Resources
Fisherman's Island State Park Map Michigan Department of Natural Resources

State parks of Michigan
Protected areas of Charlevoix County, Michigan
Beaches of Michigan
Landforms of Charlevoix County, Michigan
Peninsulas of Michigan
Protected areas established in 1975
1975 establishments in Michigan
IUCN Category III